Noel Davis (born Edgar Davis; 1 March 1927 – 24 November 2002) was a British film and television actor; and latterly, a film and television casting director.

Partial filmography
 Darling (1965) - Shop Assistant (uncredited)
 Fahrenheit 451 (1966) - Charles (uncredited)
 Two a Penny (1967) - Dennis Lancaster
 Isadora (1968) - Doctor
 Journey into Darkness (1968) - Charles Philips (episode 'Paper Dolls')
 Some Will, Some Won't (1970) - Stewart
 Clegg (1970) - Manager
 A Touch of the Other (1970) - Max Ronieau
 Macbeth (1971) - Seyton
 Freelance (1971) - Derek
 The Trouble with 2B (1972)
 Young Winston (1972) - Interviewer
 Yellow Dog (1976) - Norman
 Prick Up Your Ears (1987) - Philip

References

External links
 

1927 births
2002 deaths
British male stage actors
British male film actors
British male television actors
British casting directors
Male actors from Liverpool